Toutiala is a town and seat of the commune of N'Golodiana in the Cercle of Kolondieba in the Sikasso Region of southern Mali.

References

Populated places in Sikasso Region